Priochilus is a genus of neotropical spider wasp in the family Pompilidae.

Species
The following species are currently classified in the genus Priochilus:

Priochilus amabilis Banks, 1946 
Priochilus captivum (Fabricius, 1804) 
Priochilus chrysopygus Wasbauer, Cambra & Anino, 2017 
Priochilus diversus Smith 
Priochilus formosus Banks, 1944 
Priochilus fustiferum Evans, 1966 
Priochilus gloriosum (Cresson, 1869) 
Priochilus gracile Evans, 1966 
Priochilus gracilis Evans, 1966 
Priochilus gracillimus Smith, 1855 
Priochilus nigrocyaneus (Guerin, 1838) 
Priochilus nobilis (Fabricius, 1787) 
Priochilus nubilus Banks, 1946 
Priochilus peruanus Banks, 1946 
Priochilus plutonis Banks, 1944 
Priochilus regius (Fabricius, 1804) 
Priochilus ruficoxalis (Fox, 1897) 
Priochilus scrupulum (Fox, 1897) 
Priochilus scutellatus (Fox, 1897) 
Priochilus sericeifrons (Fox, 1897) 
Priochilus splendidulus (Fabricius, 1804) 
Priochilus superbus Banks, 1944 
Priochilus veraepacis (Cameron, 1893) 
Priochilus vitulinus (Dalla Torre, 1897)

References 

Hymenoptera genera
Pompilinae